Cyanonephron elegans is a freshwater species of cyanobacteria in the family Synechococcaceae. It is described in the Netherlands, Siberia, Russia and Queensland, Australia.

References 

 McGregor, G. (2013). Freshwater Cyanobacteria from North-Eastern Australia: 2. Chroococcales. Phytotaxa 133: 1-130

External links 
 
 Cyanonephron elegans at algaebase

Synechococcales
Bacteria described in 2006
Biota of Queensland
Biota of the Netherlands
Biota of Siberia